Kichka is a surname. Notable people with the surname include:

Henri Kichka (1926–2020), Belgian writer and Holocaust survivor
Michel Kichka (born 1954), Israeli cartoonist and illustrator, son of Henri

See also
 Kishka (disambiguation)